Theresa Berkley or Berkeley (died September 1836) was a 19th-century English dominatrix who ran a brothel in Hallam Street, just to the east of Portland Place, Marylebone, London, specialising in flagellation. She is notable as the inventor of the "chevalet" or "Berkley Horse", a BDSM apparatus.

Career as a dominatrix 

Theresa Berkley ran a high-class flagellation brothel at 28 Charlotte Street (which is today's 84–94 Hallam Street). She was a "governess", i.e. she specialised in chastisement, whipping, flagellation, and the like. She invented the "Berkley Horse", an apparatus that reportedly earned her a fortune in flogging wealthy men and women of the time. 

There are no artworks depicting what Theresa Berkley looked like, and occasional descriptions usually report that she was attractive, with a strong disposition. An expert with all instruments of torture, her talents became highly sought after by the aristocracy of the day. She was a master of the art of inflicting pain for pleasure, and practised absolute privacy to protect her clientele. Her clients were said to have been both men and women of wealth, and her career was financially lucrative. Berkley's fame was such that the pornographic novel Exhibition of Female Flagellants was attributed to her, probably falsely.

One writer said of her: 

According to an unnamed source quoted by Henry Spencer Ashbee, she used a wide variety of torture instruments, including cat-o'-nine-tails, leather straps, holly brushes, green nettles, and a hook and pulley. Berkley enjoyed a certain amount of torture inflicted on her by her clients, given that they were willing to pay her price, but she also employed a number of women for that task if indeed her clients wished to inflict more pain than she was willing to take herself.

After her death 

Shortly after her death in 1836, her brother, who had been a missionary for 30 years in Australia, arrived in England. When he learned the source from which the property she had left him had been derived, he renounced all claim, and immediately went back to Australia.

Dr Vance came into possession of her correspondence, several boxes, which was said to have contained letters from the highest aristocracy, both male and female, in the land. The letters were eventually destroyed.

Notes

References

 Anil Aggrawal, Forensic and Medico-Legal Aspects of Sexual Crimes and Unusual Sexual Practices, CRC Press, 2008, p. 150
 Patricia J. Anderson, When Passion Reigned: sex and the Victorians, BasicBooks, 1995, p. 98
 Åke E. Andersson, Nils-Eric Sahlin, "The complexity of creativity", Synthese library: studies in epistemology, logic, methodology, and philosophy of science v. 258, Springer, 1997, p. 59
 Iwan Bloch, Le Marquis de Sade et Son Temps, Editions Slatkine, repr. 1970, p. 196
 Iwan Bloch, The Sexual Life of Our Time in Its Relations to Modern Civilization, BiblioBazaar repr. 2009, p. 573
 Iwan Bloch, Sexual Life in England, Past and Present, F. Aldor, 1938, p. 353
 Bernhardt J. Hurwood, The Golden Age of Erotica, Sherbourne Press, 1965
 John K. Noyes, "The mastery of submission: inventions of masochism", Cornell studies in the history of psychiatry, Cornell University Press, 1997, pp. 12–14
 Mike Pentelow, Marsha Rowe, Characters of Fitzrovia, Chatto & Windus, 2001, p. 97
 Geoffrey Leslie Simons, A Place for Pleasure: the history of the brothel, Harwood-Smart Publishing, 1975, p. 52
 Autumn Stanley, Mothers and daughters of invention: notes for a revised history of technology, Volume 36", Rutgers University Press, 1995, pp. 585–586

Bibliography
 Ashbee, Henry Spencer Ashbee (aka "Pisanus Fraxi") (1969) Index of Forbidden Books (written during the 1880s as Index Librorum Prohibitorum). London: Sphere
 Marcus, Steven (1966) The Other Victorians: a Study of Sexuality and Pornography in Mid-Nineteenth-Century England. London: Weidenfeld & Nicolson 

1836 deaths
Year of birth unknown
English brothel owners and madams
English dominatrices
Women inventors
English inventors
People from Soho
Whipping
19th-century English businesspeople
19th-century English businesswomen